Aero Rent (Авиакомпания "Аэро Рент") is an airline based in Cheryomushki District, South-Western Administrative Okrug, Moscow, Russia. It operated global VIP charter flights out of Moscow Vnukovo International Airport and facilitated the chartering of aircraft from other airlines.

History
The airline was registered by the Moscow Chamber of Commerce on 9 March 1995.

Airline ceased in November 2011.

Fleet
As of July 8, 2012

References

External links

Official Website 
Official website 

Defunct airlines of Russia
Defunct charter airlines
Airlines established in 2001
Companies based in Moscow
2011 disestablishments in Russia
Russian companies established in 2001
Russian companies established in 1995